The 2017 season was Madura United's 2nd competitive season and 1st season in the top flight of Indonesia football (2016 Indonesia Soccer Championship A was not counted as an official league) and Liga 1.

Coaching staff
{|class="wikitable"
|-
!Position
!Staff
|-
|Head coach|| Gomes de Olivera
|-
|Assistant coach|| Winnedy Purwito
|-
|Goalkeeper coach|| Hermansyah
|-
|Team analysis|| Fabio Olivera
|-

Squad information

 FP = Foreign player
 INJ = Injury foreign player
 MP = Marquee player
 U23 = Under-23 player

Competitions

Overview

{| class="wikitable" style="text-align: center"
|-
!rowspan=2|Competition
!colspan=8|Record
!rowspan=2|Started round
!rowspan=2|Final position / round
!rowspan=2|First match	
!rowspan=2|Last match
|-
!
!
!
!
!
!
!
!
|-
| Liga 1

| —
| In Progress
| 16 April 2017
| In Progress
|-
! Total

Liga 1

League table

Results summary

Results by matchday

Matches

The fixtures for the 2017 season were announced on 16 April 2017.

Statistics

Appearances

Top scorers
The list is sorted by shirt number when total goals are equal.

Top assists
The list is sorted by shirt number when total assists are equal.

Clean sheets
The list is sorted by shirt number when total clean sheets are equal.

Attendances

Summary

References

Madura United
Madura United F.C. seasons